The New Zealand Winter Games (NZWG) is an international multi-sport event held every two years in New Zealand. The event is organised by the Winter Games New Zealand Trust.

Overview
The Games are organised by the Winter Games New Zealand Trust with the support of the Government of New Zealand, Sport and Recreation New Zealand and the New Zealand Olympic Committee.

The inaugural New Zealand Winter Games was held in August 2009 in Dunedin, Queenstown, Wanaka, and Naseby, which are all situated in the Otago region of New Zealand. Events included alpine skiing, cross-country skiing, curling, figure skating, freestyle skiing, ice hockey, and snowboarding, as well as two demonstration events of winter triathlon and luge. Canada was the overall winner of the games, with the United States and Japan in second and third respectively.

The second Winter Games were held in August 2011. Methven, which is situated in the Canterbury region, was added as a venue alongside the venues from the previous Games. The number of events was increased from seven to nine. Winter triathlon was promoted to a full event and short track was added. In 2013 and 2015 the number of events were decreased to five.

List of Games

References

External links 
 Official website

 
Winter multi-sport events
Multi-sport events in New Zealand
Winter sports in New Zealand
Recurring sporting events established in 2009
2009 establishments in New Zealand